Juan Antonio March Pujol (born 27 February 1958) is a Spanish diplomat and is the current Ambassador Extraordinary and Plenipotentiary of the Kingdom of Spain to the Russian Federation, presenting his Letter of Credence to then-President of Russia Vladimir Putin on 22 April 2008.

References 

1958 births
Living people
Ambassadors of Spain to Russia